Flamengo Esporte Clube, commonly known as Flamengo, was a Brazilian football club based in Varginha, Minas Gerais state.

History
The club was founded on 8 August 1979. Flamengo won the Campeonato Mineiro Second Level in 1988. The club folded in 1993.

Achievements

 Campeonato Mineiro Second Level:
 Winners (1): 1988

Stadium
Flamengo Esporte Clube played their home games at Estádio Rubro-Negro. The stadium has a maximum capacity of 2,000 people.

References

Association football clubs established in 1979
Association football clubs disestablished in 1993
Defunct football clubs in Minas Gerais
1979 establishments in Brazil
1993 disestablishments in Brazil